Grandicrepidula grandis, common name : the giant slipper limpet,  is a species of sea snail, a marine gastropod mollusk in the family Calyptraeidae, the slipper snails or slipper limpets, cup-and-saucer snails, and Chinese hat snails.

Description

Distribution
This species is distributed in the Pacific Ocean along Japan and the Aleutians.

References

External links
 

Calyptraeidae
Gastropods described in 1849